Faisal, Faisel, Fayçal or Faysal is an Arabic given name.
Faisal, Fayçal or Faysal may also refer to:

People
 King Faisal (disambiguation)
 Faisal I of Iraq and Syria (1885–1933), leader during the Arab Revolt
 Faisal II of Iraq (1935–1958), last King of the Kingdom of Iraq
 Faisal of Saudi Arabia (1906–1975), third King of Saudi Arabia
Faisal Al-Fayez (Born 1952) Jordanian Prime Minster.
Faisal al-Duwaish (1882–1931), Arabian tribe sheik
 Faisal Karami (born 1971), Lebanese politician
 Faisal bin Abdullah Al Saud (born 1950), Saudi royal
 Faisal bin Bandar Al Saud (born 1945), Saudi government official
 Faisal bin Bandar Al Saud, Saudi royal and businessman
 Faisal bin Khalid Al Saud (born 1973), Saudi government official 
 Faisal bin Mishaal Al Saud (born 1959), Saudi government official
 Faisal bin Musaid Al Saud, Saudi royal
 Faisal bin Sattam Al Saud (born 1970), Saudi ambassador to Italy
 Faisal bin Turki Al Saud, Saudi royal
 Faisal bin Turki I Al Saud (1920–1968), Saudi royal
 Faisal Saeed Al Mutar (1991–Present), Iraqi Human Rights Activist

Places
 Faisal Cantonment, a cantonment town in Karachi, Pakistan
 Faisal Colony, a neighbourhood of New Karachi Town in Karachi, Pakistan.
 Faisal Equestrian Club, an equestrian club and restaurant in Gaza
 Faisal Town, a residential area of Lahore
 King Faisal Mosque (disambiguation)
 Faisal Mosque in Islamabad, Pakistan
 King Faisal Mosque, Sharjah, United Arab Emirates

Other uses
 Faisal (film), a 2017 Indian film retitled Rubaai
 Faysal Bank, a bank based in Pakistan

See also 
Fadhil
 Fazal
 Faisalabad, a city in Punjab, Pakistan

Arabic masculine given names

fr:Fayçal